Marston Gate Railway station was a station on the London and North Western Railway - Aylesbury Branch serving the nearby village of Long Marston, Hertfordshire. The station was the only intermediate stop on the line, which ran to Cheddington where it met with the main line.

History
The main use of Marston Gate was for transportation of Milk, Cattle and Manure, and it was recorded that in the early 1900s around 50 milk churns were loaded at this station every day - heading for the Nestlé factory in Aylesbury.  Fruit from the orchards in the local area was also transported from the station.

The station saw passenger use from its opening until 1953 when a bus service was introduced and took over from the line, although it was still used for rail freight; the line closed completely in 1963.

Routes
The trains calling at this station would go to Cheddington or Aylesbury

Today
As of December 2018, the station house is still in existence - albeit rebuilt and for use as a private house.  The road to Long Marston is still called Station Road.

References

Sources
 Long Marston Website - village history
 Station on navigable O.S. map

Former London and North Western Railway stations
Disused railway stations in Hertfordshire
Railway stations in Great Britain opened in 1860
Railway stations in Great Britain closed in 1963